Without a Net is a live album by American jazz saxophonist Wayne Shorter together with his ‘Footprints’ Quartet: pianist Danilo Perez, bassist John Patitucci and drummer Brian Blade. The album was released on 5 February 2013 via Blue Note to a critical success, receiving an average score of 86/100 from 11 reviewers on Metacritic, which indicates "universal acclaim".

Background
Without a Net is Shorter's first album for Blue Note Records in 43 years after Odyssey of Iska released in 1971. The album contains eight quartet tracks from its European tour in late 2011, including six original compositions, plus a 23-minute centrepiece "Pegasus" supported by the woodwind and brass ensemble Imani Winds. The composition "Orbits" is a new version of the Miles Davis Quintet’s 1967 song of the same name. For "Orbits" the album won 2014 Grammy Award for Best Jazz Instrumental Solo. The quartet also included the title song from the 1933 musical film Flying Down to Rio.

Reception
Will Layman of PopMatters wrote "Wayne Shorter and his quartet are not just a good or great jazz group, they are a single voice of one of the best American musicians we’ve had in the last 50 years. This is a musician who is far from in his valedictory years. Wayne Shorter seems, only now, to be saying all that he has had to say. And Without a Net ought to get a superb listening. It’s the shape of where jazz has been and where it is today."

Chris Barton of The Los Angeles Times stated "the album is a sprawling, relentlessly inventive listen that nods toward Shorter’s rich legacy as a true musical giant, even while pointing toward an undeniable truth that, even at 80 years old, he isn’t finished exploring yet."

Rob Shepherd of PostGenre noted, "While the performances by the saxophonist and his long-standing quartet ... are extraordinary, it is really the compositions which come to the fore. Throughout, they reconstruct an eclectic complication of songs ranging from new tunes to longstanding originals including those once played with Miles’ Second Great Quintet or Weather Report. Like with the rest of Shorter's scores, even the oldest of these is made to sound not just new and contemporary but, at times, futuristic."

Track listing

Personnel
Wayne Shorter Quartet
Wayne Shorter – tenor saxophone, soprano saxophone
John Patitucci – bass 
Brian Blade  – drums
Danilo Perez – piano

Production
Wayne Shorter – producer, illustration
Scott Southard – executive producer
Don Was – A&R
Steve Cook – A&R administration

Gabriel Fonseca – assistant engineer (recording)
Rob Griffin – engineer (mixing)
Jeff Ciampa – assistant engineer (mixing)
Mark Wilder – engineer (mastering)

Tom Korkidis – production coordinator
Gordon H Jee – creative director, design
Robert Ascroft – photography

References

External links 
 Wayne Shorter Quartet - Without a Net (rec. 2010, rel. 2013) album releases & credits at Discogs
 Wayne Shorter Quartet - Without a Net (rec. 2010, rel. 2013) album to be listened on Spotify

2013 live albums
Blue Note Records live albums
Wayne Shorter live albums